Kruopinė (Žybartonys) Hill is a hill located near Vilnius regarded as the second highest point in Lithuania. Its elevation is 293,65 metres. The status of the highest elevation in Lithuania is now being attributed to Aukštojas Hill (293,84 metres). Juozapinė Hill (292,7 metres), formerly known as the highest hill in Lithuania, is currently regarded as the third highest elevation in Lithuania. Kruopinė (Žybartonys) Hill is situated approximately 10 kilometres west of Juozapinė Hill and the adjacent Aukštojas Hill.

External links 
 Which are the highest hills in Lithuania? a note by Rimantas Krupickas, a Lithuanian geographer, on the recent measurements of the highest elevations in Lithuania 

Hills of Lithuania